This is a complete list of Nashville Predators draft picks,  ice hockey players who were drafted in the National Hockey League Entry Draft by the Nashville Predators franchise. It includes every player who was drafted, regardless of whether they played for the team. David Legwand became the Predators' first amateur draft pick during the 1998 NHL Entry Draft. Selected second overall, he appeared in one game for the Predators during the 1998–99 season, and joined the team full-time the next season. As the longest serving Predator, Legwand holds team records for games played, goals, assists, and points. The Predators selected Brian Finley sixth overall in 1999. Finley appeared in two games for the Predators during his career, allowing 10 goals in 107 minutes. Alexander Radulov was the first European selected by the Predators in the first round when he was taken 15th overall in 2004.

Key

Draft picks

 

 

Statistics are complete as of the 2021–22 NHL season and show each player's career regular season totals in the NHL.  Wins, losses, ties, overtime losses and goals against average apply to goaltenders and are used only for players at that position. A player listed with a dash under the games played column has not played in the NHL.

See also
List of Nashville Predators players
1998 NHL Expansion Draft

References

Specific

General 

 
Draft history: 
Draft history: 
Player statistics:
Player statistics: 

 
draft picks
Nashville Predators